The third season of Dynasty originally aired in the United States on ABC from October 27, 1982 through April 20, 1983. The series, created by Richard and Esther Shapiro and produced by Aaron Spelling, revolves around the Carringtons, a wealthy family residing in Denver, Colorado.

Season three stars John Forsythe as millionaire oil magnate Blake Carrington; Linda Evans as his wife Krystle; Pamela Sue Martin as Blake and Alexis's headstrong daughter Fallon; Jack Coleman as Blake and Alexis's earnest son Steven; Gordon Thomson as Blake and Alexis's eldest son Adam; John James as Fallon's ex-husband Jeff Colby; Lloyd Bochner as Jeff's uncle, Cecil Colby; Pamela Bellwood as Claudia Blaisdel, the widow of Krystle's former lover; Heather Locklear as Krystle's niece and Steven's ex-wife Sammy Jo; Geoffrey Scott as Krystle's ex-husband Mark Jennings; Lee Bergere as Carrington majordomo Joseph Anders; Kathleen Beller as Joseph's daughter Kirby; and Joan Collins as Alexis Colby, Blake's ex-wife and the mother of Adam, Fallon, and Steven.

Development
In season three, Dynasty introduced Gordon Thomson in the role of Adam Carrington, Blake and Alexis's eldest child, who had been kidnapped as an infant ever never found. According to Thomson, "They had planned on Adam being an impostor but they liked him so much they decided to keep him on. They tested me for 13 shows, then extended that to 24." Steven Carrington was recast with Jack Coleman in 1983, the change in appearance attributed to plastic surgery after an oil rig explosion.

Dynasty was ranked #5 in the United States for season three. The April 1983 episode "The Threat", which features the first use of the word "bitch" in a prime time network series as well as a catfight between Krystle and Alexis in a lily pond, was ranked #67 on the 2009 TV Guide list of "Top 100 Episodes".

Plot
In the third season, Alexis marries Cecil on his deathbed and acquires his company, ColbyCo. In the meantime, Adam, the long-lost son of Alexis and Blake who had been kidnapped in infancy, reappears in Denver and almost starts an affair with Fallon before they discover they are siblings. Also introduced are Krystle's ex-husband, tennis pro Mark Jennings, and Kirby Anders, the daughter of longtime Carrington majordomo Joseph. Kirby catches Adam's eye but weds Jeff after his divorce from Fallon. In the middle of the season, news that Steven has been killed in an accident in Indonesia comes to the Carringtons; he survives, but undergoes plastic surgery and returns to Denver. In the third-season cliffhanger, Alexis lures Krystle to Steven's cabin and the two are locked inside while the cabin is set ablaze by an unseen arsonist.

Cast

Main

 John Forsythe as Blake Carrington
 Linda Evans as Krystle Carrington
 Pamela Sue Martin as Fallon Carrington
 Pamela Bellwood as Claudia Blaisdel
 John James as Jeff Colby 
 Lloyd Bochner as Cecil Colby
Gordon Thomson as Adam Carrington
Kathleen Beller as Kirby Anders
Geoffrey Scott as Mark Jennings
 Heather Locklear as Sammy Jo Carrington
Jack Coleman as Steven Carrington
 Lee Bergere as Joseph Anders
 Joan Collins as Alexis Carrington

Recurring

 Paul Burke as Neal McVane
 James Hong as Dr. Chen Ling
 Christine Belford as Susan Farragut
 Virginia Hawkins as Jeanette Robbins
 Betty Harford as Hilda Gunnerson
 Hank Brandt as Morgan Hess
 Grant Goodeve as Chris Deegan

Notable guest stars

 Peter Mark Richman as Andrew Laird
 David Hedison as Sam Dexter
 Joanne Linville as Claire Maynard
 Simon MacCorkindale as Billy Dawson
 Tim O'Connor as Thomas Crayford
 Kabir Bedi as Farouk Ahmed

Cast notes

Episodes

Reception
In season three, Dynasty was ranked #5 in the United States with a 22.4 Nielsen rating.

References

External links 
 

1982 American television seasons
1983 American television seasons
Dynasty (1981 TV series) seasons